The 1975 Virginia Slims of Washington  was a women's tennis tournament played on indoor carpet courts at the James Robinson School Field House in Fairfax, Virginia in the United States that was part of the 1975 Virginia Slims World Championship Series. It was the fourth edition of the tournament and was held from January 27 through February 2, 1975. Eighth-seeded Martina Navratilova won the singles title and earned $15,000 first-prize money. In the quarterfinal she had defeated Chris Evert for the first time in their rivalry, after five consecutive wins for Evert.

Finals

Singles
 Martina Navratilova defeated  Kerry Melville 6–3, 6–1

Doubles
 Françoise Dürr /  Betty Stöve defeated  Helen Gourlay /  Kerry Melville 6–3, 6–4

Prize money

References

Virginia Slims of Washington
Virginia Slims of Washington
1975 in sports in Washington, D.C.
Virgin